Deepak Prakash (born 10 March 1992 in Bangalore, Karnataka) is an Indian footballer who currently plays for Students Union of the Bangalore Super Division.

Career

Early career
Deepak got addicted to football when he was in class IV in the Corporation Government School in Jogpalya.

The talented youngster was forced to quit studies when in Class X but it got him more and more into football and the beautiful game showed him the way forward.

"After reading the news about the selection for the state U-16 side he went for the trials and got selected. In 2006, he was called for the national camp and then got selected to the Tata FA in 2007.

"He was the top-scorer when Karnataka finished runners-up in the South Zone and reached the semifinals of the U-16 nationals in 2007.

He emerged as the joint top-scorer for Jharkhand in the junior nationals in Mandya.

After passing out from Tata FA in 2010, Deepak played for Mumbai F.C. In 2011-12 season was a homecoming of sorts for the talented Murphy Town boy when he signed for the Aircraftmen. However, he had a barren season for HAL as he was hardly seen playing in I-League.

Pailan Arrows
On 13 August 2012 it was officially confirmed that Prakash had signed for Pailan Arrows of the I-League after HAL S.C. were relegated from the I-League.

While with Arrows, Prakash was loaned out to I-League 2nd Division side DSK Shivajians for the 2013 I-League 2nd Division season.

Students Union
On 19 December 2014, it was revealed that Prakash had signed for local Bangalore Super Division side Students Union.

Career statistics

Club
Statistics accurate as of 15 September 2012

References

External links 
 Goal Profile

Indian footballers
1992 births
Footballers from Bangalore
Living people
I-League players
Mumbai FC players
Hindustan Aeronautics Limited S.C. players
Indian Arrows players
DSK Shivajians FC players
Association football midfielders